The Northern Territory Minister for Tourism and Culture is a Minister of the Crown in the Government of the Northern Territory, Australia. The minister administers their portfolio through the Department of Tourism and Culture.

The Minister is responsible for Aboriginal sacred sites, archives management, arts and cultural development, the Arts Grants Board, botanic gardens, the collection and preservation of natural and cultural heritage, community grants for recreation and sports associations, conservation and wildlife, film, television and new media, heritage conservation, the Indigenous Arts Reference Group, library and information services, major events, management of cultural facilities, management of territory parks and reserves, sport and recreation, sporting events, sporting facilities, tourism, the Territory Wildlife Park and the Alice Springs Desert Park, tourist event development, attracting and acquisition, tourism infrastructure development, tourism strategy, water safety, wildlife management and the Window on the Wetlands.

The current minister is Natasha Fyles (Labor). She was sworn in on 8 September 2020 following the Labor victory at the 2020 election. The responsibilities of the ministry expanded substantially at that time, as it was renamed "Tourism and Culture" and incorporated the roles of three formerly separate ministries: Arts and Museums, Parks and Wildlife, and Sport and Recreation.

There are two assistant ministers attached to the portfolio: Tony Sievers (assistant minister for sports and community events) and Kate Worden (assistant minister for bringing back the Arafura Games), as part of the Gunner government's decision to appoint all government backbenchers as assistant ministers.

List of Ministers for Tourism

Arts and Museums

Sport and Recreation

Parks and Wildlife

References

Northern Territory-related lists
Ministers of the Northern Territory government
Tourism in the Northern Territory